The 2014 Laurie O'Reilly Cup was the eight edition of the competition and was held on 1st June at Rotorua. New Zealand retained the O'Reilly Cup after defeating Australia 38–3.

Match

References 

Laurie O'Reilly Cup
Australia women's national rugby union team
New Zealand women's national rugby union team
Laurie O'Reilly Cup